The 1963–64 Taça de Portugal was the 24th edition of the Portuguese football knockout tournament, organized by the Portuguese Football Federation (FPF). The 1963–64 Taça de Portugal began on 22 September 1963. The final was played on 5 July 1964 at the Estádio Nacional.

Sporting CP were the previous holders, having defeated Vitória de Guimarães 4–0 in the previous season's final. Defending champions Sporting CP were eliminated in the third round by Vitória de Setúbal. Benfica defeated Porto, 6–2 in the final to win their twelfth Taça de Portugal.

First round 
Teams from the Primeira Liga (I) and the Portuguese Second Division (II) entered at this stage. Each side would contest a second round place by playing two matches: one home and one away match. In case the aggregate score after the two games was level, the cup tie would be replayed.

|}

Second round 
Due to the odd number of teams involved at this stage of the competition, Sporting CP qualified for the next round due to having no opponent to face at this stage of the competition.

|}

Third round 
Due to the odd number of teams involved at this stage of the competition, Lusitano de Évora qualified for the next round due to having no opponent to face at this stage of the competition.

|}

Quarter-finals 
Due to the odd number of teams who progressed to the quarter final stage of the competition, Mozambican side Ferroviário de Maputo and Lusitânia were invited to participate in the competition.

|}

Semi-finals 
Lusitânia forfeited their semi-final tie against Porto, which led to the Dragões progressing to the final.

|}

Final

References 

Taça de Portugal seasons
Portugal
Taca